The following is a list of conflicts involving the jihadist militant group known as the Islamic State (IS/ISIL/ISIS/Daesh), throughout its various incarnations. The group controlled portions of territory in Iraq and Syria in the mid-2010s and has taken part in many attacks, battles and wars.

Wars
Since late 2013, the wars in Syria have merged into a single war that includes a spillover into Lebanon and Iraq.
War on Terror
War against the Islamic State
American-led intervention in the Syrian civil war
American-led intervention in Iraq (2014–2021)
German intervention against the Islamic State
Jordanian intervention in the Syrian civil war
Russian military intervention in the Syrian civil war
Turkish military intervention in Syria
Iranian intervention in Iraq (2014–present)
Iraqi conflict (2003–present)
Iraq War
Iraqi civil war (2006–2008)
Iraqi insurgency (2011–2013)
War in Iraq (2013–2017)
Islamic State insurgency in Iraq (2017–present)
Syrian civil war
Syrian civil war spillover in Lebanon
Syrian civil war spillover in Iraq
Inter-rebel conflict during the Syrian civil war
Syrian civil war spillover in Turkey
Israeli–Syrian ceasefire line incidents during the Syrian civil war
Rojava conflict
Rojava-Islamist conflict
Sinai insurgency
Terrorism in Egypt (2013–present)
Second Libyan Civil War
War in Afghanistan (2001–2021)
Insurgency in Khyber Pakhtunkhwa
Insurgency in Cabo Delgado
Civil conflict in the Philippines
Moro conflict
Yemeni Civil War
Saudi Arabian-led intervention in Yemen
Al-Qaeda insurgency in Yemen
Boko Haram insurgency
2015 Niger raid
American military intervention in Cameroon
Insurgency in the North Caucasus
Islamic State insurgency in the North Caucasus
Insurgency in the Maghreb (2002–present)
Islamic State insurgency in Tunisia
Somali Civil War
Somali Civil War (2009–present)
Internal conflict in Bangladesh
Gaza–Israel conflict
Kivu conflict
Allied Democratic Forces insurgency
Internal conflict in Bangladesh

Battles
Islamic State of Iraq

Islamic State of Iraq and the Levant

See also
List of wars and battles involving al-Qaeda

References

 
 

Lists of armed conflicts in the 21st century
ISIL